Ebenezer International school (EISB) is a residential and day school located in Bangalore, India. It was founded in 2006.

Location 
EISB is located in Bangalore in the Electronic City zone, which houses major electronics and IT corporations.

Administration and management 
Mrs. Anuradha Krishnan is the Principal of Ebenezer International school

Campus and infrastructure 
EISB is spread across a 12-acre campus. There are separate blocks for kindergarten education, primary and secondary education. There is boarding facility available for both girls and boys. The school has a sports complex with an international standards swimming pool, a meditation hall, canteen, laboratories and libraries.

Ebenezer International School Bangalore(EISB) offers various curricula:

Primary : 

 IB PYP(Primary Years Program) from Grades 1 to 5.

Middle School : 

 CAIE( Cambridge Assessment International Examination) from Grades 6 to 8

 ICSE curriculum (Indian Certificate of Secondary Education) from Grades 6 to 8 

Secondary: 

 IGCSE(International General Certificate of Secondary Education) to Grades 9 &10

 ICSE curriculum (Indian Certificate of Secondary Education) to Grades 9 & 10

Senior Secondary: 

 IBDP(International Baccalaureate Diploma Program) for Grades 11 & 12

Curricula Offered

Ebenezer International School Bangalore(EISB) offers various curricula:

Primary : 

 IB PYP(Primary Years Program) from Grades 1 to 5.

Middle School : 

 CAIE( Cambridge Assessment International Examination) from Grades 6 to 8

 ICSE curriculum (Indian Certificate of Secondary Education) from Grades 6 to 8 

Secondary: 

 IGCSE(International General Certificate of Secondary Education) to Grades 9 &10

 ICSE curriculum (Indian Certificate of Secondary Education) to Grades 9 & 10

Senior Secondary: 

 IBDP(International Baccalaureate Diploma Program) for Grades 11 & 12

International schools in Bangalore